The following highways are numbered 749:

Costa Rica
 National Route 749

Ireland
R749 regional road

United States